Mississippi Central Railroad is a railroad line from Oxford, Mississippi to Grand Junction, Tennessee.

Mississippi Central Railroad may also refer to:

Mississippi Central Railroad (1852-1874), a predecessor to the Illinois Central Railroad
Mississippi Central Railroad (1904-1967), another line purchased by the Illinois Central Railroad in 1967